The Lake Placid Tower in Lake Placid, Florida, formerly named Placid Tower, Tower of Peace or Happiness Tower, is a closed observation tower  tall according to early sources (before 1982) or  tall according to late sources (after 1986). However, no physical modification of the tower occurred in the interim that would explain a 30-foot increase in height.

Background
The apex of the tower is a flashing red aircraft warning light. The tower offered a  panoramic view.

Earnest Oakley Hunt dreamed of building an observation tower when he moved to Orlando in 1938, then moved to Sebring in 1947 and found the perfect location in nearby Lake Placid. He and Robert Gray formed Air View Corporation to build the tower. The tower was designed by architect A. Wynn Howell of Lakeland, built by Ridge Builders of Sebring in 1960 for $350,000, and opened . Most sources state that it was the tallest concrete block structure in the world when it opened, with 90,000 concrete blocks, but the magazine Florida Architect states that it was built of reinforced concrete. One source states that the tower included 100,000 limestone blocks from Ocala while another states that it was faced with ceramic tile, implying that the tower has a facade of limestone tile. The section above the balcony is  square, also with corner grooves. Each wall is divided into vertical thirds. The outer thirds are composed of reinforced concrete blocks with a facade of limestone tile. The middle thirds are composed of decorative breeze or fence concrete blocks, which can only support themselves. The tracery atop the tower is made of gold anodized aluminum.

Because of low ticket sales, the tower closed in 1982 when the owner would not pay their Internal Revenue Service taxes, but it was re-opened in 1986. The small group of owners still faced sluggish sales, and the tower and its restaurant continued to struggle, despite features such as a petting zoo in its plaza, and a pay phone at the top billed as the "highest pay phone in Florida." The last owner who operated the tower as a tourist attraction was Lake Placid Tower Group owned by Mark Cambell since 1992. Even though the tower closed about 2003, it still has two red "OPEN" signs at its top, facing north and south. Originally, the tower above the balcony had the same basic design scheme as that below it. But after the tower closed, the portion of the tower from the balcony up was redesigned with a white and cyan (blue-green) color scheme. The limestone tile of the outer thirds of the walls was covered with white stucco, and the middle thirds were covered with thin cyan-colored panels which blocked the bird's eye view. These panels covered the two opposing triangular openings (top and bottom) in the middle third of each wall and the breeze or fence blocks between them. The roof tracery above and the balcony below them were also painted cyan. The Tower View restaurant at the base of the tower closed in 2015. The tower has been abandoned since 2020. The tower is among 35 designated Lake Placid historic structures. It is one of three towers in Central Florida, including the Citrus Tower, built in 1956,  to the north in Clermont, and Bok Tower, built in 1929,  to the north in Lake Wales. 

As of June 2022, the tower is home to T-Mobile 5G cellular service and amateur radio communications by the Highlands County Amateur Radio Club W4HCA.

References

External links

Towers in Florida
Observation towers in the United States
Towers completed in 1960
Buildings and structures in Highlands County, Florida
1961 establishments in Florida
2003 disestablishments in Florida